James Stanton may refer to:

James V. Stanton (born 1932), U.S. Representative from Ohio
James Nicholas Stanton (born 1984), birth name of Jim Sterling, British/American video game critic 
James Stanton (water polo) (born 1983), Australian water polo player
Jamie Stanton (alpine skier) (born 1994), American Paralympic alpine skier
James Stanton V (1771–1829), namesake of Stantonsburg, North Carolina
Jimmy Stanton (1860–1932), English footballer
James M. Stanton (born 1946), American bishop

See also
Jim Stanton, composer and writer
Jamie Stanton (born 1995), Australian rules footballer